Bohdan Olexandrovich Blyzniuk (ukr. Богдан Оlexandrovich Близнюк; born March 31, 1995) is a Ukrainian basketball player for BC Budivelnyk of the European North Basketball League and the Champions League. He played college basketball for the Eastern Washington Eagles, where he was named Big Sky Conference Player of the Year in 2018.

Early life
Blyzniuk was born in Lutsk, Ukraine. He was less than 2 years old when his father, a truck driver, died in an accident. Their mother moved them to Federal Way, Washington five years later to be closer to family. His older brother, Dmytro, and his mother, Liudmyla, helped raise Bohdan, while also caring for his grandmother.

Blyzniuk became a U.S. citizen in February 2016.

College career
Blyzniuk played college basketball for the Eastern Washington University's Eagles.

On March 9, 2018, Blyzniuk became the Big Sky Conference’s all-time leading scorer, passing Orlando Lightfoot’s mark of 2,102 set in 1994. Earlier in the season, Bliznyuk claimed the school all-time scoring mark, passing Venky Jois’ total of 1,803. Bliznyuk's conference career scoring mark stood until the following season, when Montana State's Tyler Hall broke it.

Bohdan finished his senior year averaging 21.1 points, 6.8 rebounds and 3.9 assists per game. He was named Big Sky Conference Player of the Year and AP Honorable Mention.

Professional career
After going undrafted in the 2018 NBA draft, Blyzniuk joined the Los Angeles Clippers for the 2018 NBA Summer League.

On July 5, 2018, Blyzniuk started his professional career with Bnei Herzliya of the Israeli Premier League, signing a three-year deal. On January 21, 2019, Bohdan recorded a season-high 18 points, shooting 7-of-13 from the field, in an 81–100 loss to Hapoel Eilat. That season,  Bnei Herzliya have finished the season in the last place out of 12 teams and was relegated to the Israeli National League (the second-tier league in Israel).

On September 30, 2019, Blyzniuk signed with Kyiv-Basket of the Ukrainian SuperLeague. During the 2020–21 season, he averaged 12.4 points, 5.5 rebounds, and 3.2 assists per game. On September 16, 2021, Bohdan signed with BC Budivelnyk.

In the 2022-23 season, he signs for BC Budivelnyk to play in the FIBA Europe Cup (playing at home in Italy) and the Balkan League.

National team career
Blyzniuk is a member of the Ukraine national team. On November 29, 2018, he made his debut in an 82–54 win over Slovenia, scoring 11 points, seven rebounds and five assists.

Career statistics

College

|-
| style="text-align:left;"| 2014–15
| style="text-align:left;"| Eastern Washington
| 35 || 0 || 19.0 || .586 || .558 || .792 || 4.0 || 1.1 || 0.5 || 0.4 || 8.7
|-
| style="text-align:left;"| 2015–16
| style="text-align:left;"| Eastern Washington
| 34 || 32 || 33.0 || .447 || .355 || .798 || 6.7 || 3.0 || 1.2 || 0.7 || 12.4
|-
| style="text-align:left;"| 2016–17
| style="text-align:left;"| Eastern Washington
| 34 || 33 || 36.8 || .474 || .317 || .821 || 6.5 || 4.0 || 1.0 || 0.2 || 20.6
|-
| style="text-align:left;"| 2017–18
| style="text-align:left;"| Eastern Washington
| 35 || 35 || 35.1 || .528 || .398 || .902 || 6.8 || 3.9 || 0.8 || 0.2 || 21.1
|-
| style="text-align:center;" colspan="2" | Career
| 138 || 100 || 30.9 || .500 || .378 || .840 || 6.0 || 3.0 || 0.9 || 0.4 || 15.7

Source: RealGM

References

External links
Eastern Washington Eagles bio
RealGM profile
FIBA profile
College stats @ sports-reference.com

1995 births
Living people
American expatriate basketball people in Israel
BC Budivelnyk players
Bnei Hertzeliya basketball players
Eastern Washington Eagles men's basketball players
Kyiv-Basket players
Naturalized citizens of the United States
Shooting guards
Small forwards
Sportspeople from Lutsk
Sportspeople from Volyn Oblast
Ukrainian emigrants to the United States
Ukrainian expatriate basketball people in the United States
Ukrainian expatriate sportspeople in Israel
Ukrainian men's basketball players